Alexander George Wharf (born 4 June 1975) is a former English ODI cricketer and a first-class cricketer. He was born in Bradford. He went to Priestman Middle School. He was 1 of 3 to be chosen for Bradford Boys. The other 2 were Abrar Hussain and Mahajid Khan. He is a right-handed batsman and a right-handed fast-medium bowler, who ended his career with the Welsh side Glamorgan County Cricket Club. He is now an umpire.

Domestic career
Wharf commenced his first-class cricketing career with Yorkshire in 1994, and played seven such matches for the county until 1997. He later joined Nottinghamshire, before moving to Glamorgan in 2000.

Wharf announced his retirement from cricket during the 2009 County Championship, after failing to recover from a long-term injury. In 2010, Wharf played in the South Wales Premier Cricket League for Sully Centurians.

International career
He never played Test cricket, but made his England One Day International debut at Trent Bridge, Nottingham, against India in 2004. Altogether he won 13 ODI caps.

Umpiring career
In 2011, he was added to the England and Wales Cricket Board list of reserve umpires, alongside the late Russell Evans and Billy Taylor.

Along with Rob Bailey, he was one of the two onfield umpires for the Hurricane Relief T20 Challenge match played at Lord's on 31 May 2018. The next month, he stood in his first One Day International (ODI) match, between England and Australia, at Sophia Gardens in Cardiff on 16 June 2018.

In October 2019, he was appointed as one of the twelve umpires to officiate matches in the 2019 ICC T20 World Cup Qualifier tournament in the United Arab Emirates. In February 2020, the ICC named him as one of the umpires to officiate in matches during the 2020 ICC Women's T20 World Cup in Australia. In June 2021, Wharf was named as the fourth official for the 2021 ICC World Test Championship Final. In August 2021, in the third match between England and India, Wharf stood in his first Test match as an umpire.

In February 2022, he was named as one of the on-field umpires for the 2022 Women's Cricket World Cup in New Zealand.

See also
 List of Test cricket umpires
 List of One Day International cricket umpires
 List of Twenty20 International cricket umpires

References

External links

1975 births
Living people
English cricketers
England One Day International cricketers
Yorkshire cricketers
Nottinghamshire cricketers
Glamorgan cricketers
Cricketers from Bradford
English cricket umpires
English Test cricket umpires
English One Day International cricket umpires
English Twenty20 International cricket umpires
English cricketers of 1969 to 2000
English cricketers of the 21st century